The 1912–13 Northern Football League season was the 24th in the history of the Northern Football League, a football competition in Northern England.

Clubs

The league featured 10 clubs which competed in the last season, along with two new clubs: 
 Craghead United
 Esh Winning Rangers

League table

References

1912-13
1912–13 in English association football leagues